A Portrait of Jon Larsen is a compilation album by Norwegian jazz guitarist Jon Larsen that was released on his label, Hot Club Records.

Review 
Larsen is celebrated on this album, which collects his best recordings from the past twenty years. It shows the acoustic string swing enthusiast he is, with vibrant, energetic original compositions that honor and continue the legacy of Django Reinhardt. But there is also room for variation and other genres, especially the tracks taken from Strange news from Mars project stand out. The guitar virtuoso is one of our most productive and open-minded musicians. Here are a number of stories from his diverse career.

Reception 
The Norwegian newspaper Hamar Arbeiderblad gave the album five stars, while the Norwegian newspaper Romerikes Blad gave it six.

Track listing

Personnel 

 Jon Larsen – guitar
 Jimmy Carl Black – vocals
 Hilde Hefte – vocals
 Bruce Fowler – trombone
 Biel Ballester – guitar
 Pierre Bluteau – guitar
 Per Frydenlund – guitar
 Pascal de Loutchek – guitar
 Stian Mevik – guitar
 Babik Reinhardt – guitar 
 Jimmy Rosenberg – guitar
 Ulf Wakenius – guitar
 Finn Hauge – harmonica
 Tommy Mars – keyboards
 Egil Kapstad – piano
 Svein Aarbostad – double bass
 Bjørn Alterhaug – double bass
 Olaf Kamfjord – double bass
 Ole Morten Vågan – double bass
 Terje Venaas – double bass
 Rob Waring – marimba
 Håkon Mjåset Johansen – drums
 Eyvind Olsen Wahlen – drums
 Paolo Vinaccia – percussion
 Aja Humm – violin
 Ola Kvernberg – violin
 Kristina Nygaard – violin
 Nina Marie Olsen – violin
 Berit Værnes – violin
 Øyvor Volle – violin
 Henninge Båtnes – viola
 Maria Syre Mjølhus – viola
 Ane Stine Dahl – cello
 Bjørg Værnes – cello

Credits 
 Jon Larsen – producer, arranger
 Egil Kapstad – string arrangements
 Bjørn Kruse – string arrangements
 Gaute Storaas – string arrangements
 Jan Petter Lynau – cover photo
 Lars Hellebust – back cover photo
 Olav Urdal – photography
 Jamie Parslow – photography
 Jens Sølvberg – photography

References 

Jon Larsen albums
2009 albums